The 2018–19 Liga Premier de México season is divided into two divisions named Serie A and Serie B. Liga Premier is the third-tier and fourth-tier football league of Mexico. The tournament began on 24 August 2018.

Serie A

Changes from the previous season
The league went on to play in a tournament per season, playing 30 games per club. Followed by the eliminatory phase between the eight best classified to determine the champion of each division.

32 teams will be participate in this season:

Murciélagos F.C. it was relegated from Ascenso MX.
Twelve reserve teams of Liga MX clubs stopped participating in Serie A.
Six teams participating in Serie B were invited to play in Serie A to compensate for the departure of Liga MX clubs reserve teams: Albinegros de Orizaba; Cimarrones de Sonora Premier; Cocodrilos de Tabasco; Correcaminos UAT Premier; Leones Negros UdeG Premier and Tuzos UAZ.
Yalmakán F.C. was promoted from Serie B after a year to improve its infrastructure and was relocated from Puerto Morelos, Quintana Roo to Chetumal, Quintana Roo.
Tlaxcala F.C. returns to Serie A after staying one year in Serie B while awaiting promotion to Ascenso MX, however, having failed to meet the requirements of Ascenso MX, the team returns to this category.
Halcones de Morelos withdrew from the competition.
Deportivo Tepic JAP was on one–year hiatus after having economic and administrative problems.
Coras de Nayarit was created to replace Deportivo Tepic JAP. The team was created because Acatlán F.C., champion of the Third Division, moved from Acatlán de Juárez, Jalisco to Tepic, Nayarit. Because the team did not meet the league's sporting requirements in its original location.
Loros UdeC and Tepatitlán de Morelos remains in Serie A after failing to meet the requirements to promote to Ascenso MX.
As of February 2019, Pacific F.C. announced its change of venue to the Estadio Teodoro Mariscal in Mazatlán.
For season second half, Dorados Fuerza UACH was renamed UACH F.C.

Stadiums and Locations

Group 1

Group 2

Regular season

Group 1

Standings

Results

Positions by round

Group 2

Standings

Results

Positions by round

Regular Season statistics

Scoring 
First goal of the season:   Alan Medina for Toluca Premier against América Premier (24 August 2018)

Top goalscorers 
Players sorted first by goals scored, then by last name.

Source: Liga Premier

Hat-tricks and more goals 

(H) – Home ; (A) – Away

Attendance

Per team

Highest and lowest

Source:Liga Premier FMF (available in each game report)

Liguilla de Ascenso (Promotion Playoffs)

The four best teams of each group play two games against each other on a home-and-away basis. The higher seeded teams play on their home field during the second leg. The winner of each match up is determined by aggregate score. In the quarterfinals and semifinals, if the two teams are tied on aggregate the higher seeded team advances. In the final, if the two teams are tied after both legs, the match goes to extra time and, if necessary, a penalty shoot-out.

Quarter-finals
The first legs will be played on 24 and 25 April, and the second legs will be played on 27 and 28 April 2019.

First leg

Second leg

Semi-finals
The first legs were played on 1 and 2 May, and the second legs were played on 4 and 5 May 2019.

First leg

Second leg

Final
The first leg was played on 8 May, and the second leg was played on 11 May 2019.

First leg

Second leg

Liguilla de Filiales (Reserve Teams Playoffs)
The four best teams of reserve teams table play two games against each other on a home-and-away basis. The higher seeded teams play on their home field during the second leg. The winner of each match up is determined by aggregate score. In the semifinals, if the two teams are tied on aggregate the higher seeded team advances. In the final, if the two teams are tied after both legs, the match goes to extra time and, if necessary, a penalty shoot-out.

Semi-finals
The first legs were played 25 April, and the second legs was played on 28 April 2019.

First leg

Second leg

Final
The first leg was played on 2 May, and the second leg was played on 5 May 2019.

First leg

Second leg

Serie B

Changes from the previous season
The league went on to play in a tournament per season, playing 30 games per club. Followed by the eliminatory phase between the eight best classified to determine the champion of the division. The tournament will be played in a single group of 16 members.

Club Marina C.R. will participate in Serie B as Third Division runner-up.
Chapulineros de Oaxaca, Deportivo Zitácuaro, Tecamachalco F.C. and FC Satélites will not participate in Serie B.
Club Calor relocated from Gomez Palacio, Durango to Monclova, Coahuila.
Due to force majeure, Inter San Miguel force to relocate from San Miguel de Allende, Guanajuato to San Luis Potosí and rename FC Potosino.
Mineros de Zacatecas Premier relocated from Tlaltenango de Sánchez Román, Zacatecas to Zacatecas City.

Stadium and locations

Regular season

Standings

Results

Positions by round

Regular Season statistics

Scoring 
First goal of the season:*First goal of the season:   Jesús Meléndez for Club Calor against Deportivo Nuevo Chimalhuacán (24 August 2018)

Top goalscorers 
Players sorted first by goals scored, then by last name.

Source: Liga Premier

Hat-tricks and more goals 

(H) – Home ; (A) – Away

Attendance

Per team

Highest and lowest

Source:Liga Premier FMF (available in each game report)

Liguilla (Playoffs)

The four best teams of each group play two games against each other on a home-and-away basis. The higher seeded teams play on their home field during the second leg. The winner of each match up is determined by aggregate score. In the quarterfinals and semifinals, if the two teams are tied on aggregate the higher seeded team advances. In the final, if the two teams are tied after both legs, the match goes to extra time and, if necessary, a penalty shoot-out.

Quarter-finals
The first legs were played on 26 and 27 April, and the second legs were played on 3, 4 and 5 May 2019.

First leg

Second leg

Semi-finals
The first legs were played on 8 May, and the second legs were played on 11 May 2019.

First leg

Second leg

Final
The first leg were played on 15 May, and the second leg will be played on 18 May 2019.

First leg

Second leg

Notes

See also 
2018–19 Liga MX season
2018–19 Ascenso MX season
2018–19 Liga TDP season

References

External links
 Official website of Liga Premier
 Magazine page 

 
1